This page shows the results of the Diving Competition for men and women at the 2007 Pan American Games, held from July 25 to July 28, 2007 in Rio de Janeiro, Brazil. There were a total number of four events, for both men and women, after the inclusion of the Synchronized Springboard and Synchronized Platform events.

Men's results

3m Springboard

10m Platform

3m Springboard Synchronized

10m Platform Synchronized

Women's competition

3m Springboard

10m Platform

3m Springboard Synchronized

10m Platform Synchronized

Medal table

See also
 Diving at the 2008 Summer Olympics

References
 Results

2007
2007 in diving
Events at the 2007 Pan American Games